Kildare Borrowes may refer to:

Sir Kildare Borrowes, 3rd Baronet (c. 1660–1709), Irish MP for Kildare County 1703–1709
Sir Kildare Borrowes, 5th Baronet (1730–1790), his grandson, Irish MP for Kildare County 1745–1776
Kildare Borrowes (cricketer) (1852–1924), English cricketer

See also
Borrowes baronets
Borrowes (surname)